The Mackinac Bands of Chippewa and Ottawa Indians is a state recognized tribe of Ojibwe and Odawa Native Americans, based in the state Michigan. The tribe is headquartered in St. Ignace, Mackinac County and has around 4,000 enrolled members. Today most tribal members live in Mackinac, Chippewa, Emmet, Cheboygan, and Presque Isle counties, however many tribal members are also located throughout the state of Michigan and the United States.

History
The Mackinac Bands of Chippewa and Ottawa Indians are descendants of Anishinaabe people who migrated from somewhere in the Northeast to the Great Lakes area (now known as Michigan) sometime around 1200 CE. Later some of the bands became centered in territories to the south and west of the lakes. The Odawa, Ojibwa, and Potawatomi people were closely related and affiliated as the Council of Three Fires.

The Mackinac Bands of these three peoples is one of the oldest and largest historical groups in Michigan. Waganagisi, better known now as L'Arbre Croche, was the largest village in the Great Lakes. The region encompassed much of present-day Emmet County from Harbor Springs and north, including Odawa clusters of lodges along Little Traverse Bay around 1740. The Odawa of L'Arbre Croche fished, hunted, and grew and gathered produce, including corn, squash, onions, cucumbers, turnips, cabbages, melon, and wild strawberries. The Odawa bartered with the French at Mackinac Island, a major fur-trading center where Lake Huron meets Lake Michigan. They traded food, bark, and canoes for good, like clothing and glass and porcelain beads. The canoes and food–including dried fish and meat and produce–supplied the fur traders who worked in the wilderness of the Great Lakes and the Upper Mississippi regions.

The Mackinac Bands of Odawa, Ojibwa and Potawatomi comprises Units 11 through 17 of the former Northern Michigan Ottawa Association, a confederation formed in 1948 to politically address the needs of the Anishinaabe peoples in Michigan. Since that time several bands have gained federal recognition, sometimes through legislation. The Sault Ste. Marie Tribe of Chippewa Indians was federally recognized in 1972. In 1979 its Tribal Council passed a resolution to accept the Mackinac Bands as members, and nearly doubled its enrollment as a result. The people who are members of the Mackinac Bands of Chippewa and Ottawa Indians withdrew to pursue federal recognition independently. The Mackinac Bands have interests and issues in common outside the Sault tribe, and they have been petitioning for federal recognition since 1998. The Mackinac Bands claims status as a successor apparent to the signatory tribe of the Treaty of Washington (1836) and Treaty of Washington (1855) with the United States of America. Most tribal members live in Emmet, Cheboygan, Presque Isle, and Mackinac counties. As of 2012 the Mackinac Bands of Chippewa and Ottawa Indians has been recognized as a State Historic Tribe by the state of Michigan. In that capacity, it has received block grants to help it provide for community services to its people.

Notable tribal members

Frank Dufina, early American golf professional

References

Bibliography

External links
 Mackinac Bands of Chippewa and Ottawa Indians, official website

Cheboygan County, Michigan
Emmet County, Michigan
Great Lakes tribes
Mackinac County, Michigan
Native American tribes in Michigan
Presque Isle County, Michigan
Ojibwe in the United States
Ojibwe governments
State-recognized tribes in the United States